McCurry is a surname. Notable people with the surname include:

People 

Duke McCurry (1900–1965), professional ice hockey left winger
Jeff McCurry (born 1970), retired Major League Baseball pitcher
Jimmy McCurry (1830–1910), Irish folk musician
Mike McCurry (press secretary) (born 1954), former press secretary for Bill Clinton's administration
Mike McCurry (referee) (born 1964), football referee from Scotland
Pete McCurry (born 1974), Human Resources Professional, Fellow of the Chartered Institute of Personnel and Development
Steve McCurry (born 1950), American photojournalist

Other uses 

McCurry, Missouri, a community in the United States
McCurry Pan, brand of McDonald's in India
McCurry-Kidd House, a house listed on the National Register of Historic Places